Stogi-Przeróbka was one of the administrative districts (dzielnica administracyjna) of Gdańsk, Poland. In 2011, the borough was divided into the districts Przeróbka and Stogi.

References

External links
Map of Stogi-Przeróbka

Gdańsk